The Asian Tour 2013/2014 – Event 1 (also known as the 2013 Yixing Open) was a professional minor-ranking snooker tournament that took place between 11 and 15 June 2013 at the Yixing Sports Centre in Yixing, China.

Joe Perry won his first title carrying ranking points by defeating Mark Selby 4–1 in the final. This was Perry's first professional title since the 2008 Championship League.

Prize fund and ranking points
The breakdown of prize money and ranking points of the event is shown below:

1 Only professional players can earn ranking points.

Main draw

Preliminary round
Best of 7 frames

Main rounds

Top half

Section 1

Section 2

Section 3

Section 4

Bottom half

Section 5

Section 6

Section 7

Section 8

Finals

Century breaks

 141  Michael White
 137, 120  Mark Selby
 127  Jack Lisowski
 125  Jin Long
 125  Jimmy White
 121, 105  Ding Junhui
 120  Cui Ming
 120  Li Hang
 118  Alfie Burden
 117, 100  Liu Chuang
 117  Yu Delu

 116  John Higgins
 116  Zhang Anda
 116  Mei Xiwen
 113  Ju Reti
 113  Jimmy Robertson
 109  Zhang Yang
 109  Gerard Greene
 105  Dominic Dale
 103  Cao Xinlong
 102  Robert Milkins
 101, 100  Guan Zhen

References

External links
 AT1 – Yixing – Pictures by World Snooker at Facebook

2013
AT1
2013 in Chinese sport